International Data Group (IDG, Inc.) is a market intelligence and demand generation company focused on the technology industry. IDG, Inc.’s mission is centered around supporting the technology industry through research, data, marketing technology, and insights that help create and sustain relationships between businesses.

IDG, Inc. is wholly owned by Blackstone and is led by Mohamad Ali, who was appointed CEO of the company in 2019. Ali serves on IDG, Inc.’s leadership team along with IDC President Crawford Del Prete, IDG, Inc.’s Chief Financial Officer Donna Marr, and Foundry President Kumaran Ramanathan. 

IDG, Inc. is headquartered in Needham, MA and is parent company to both International Data Corporation (IDC) and Foundry (formerly IDG Communications).

History
International Data Group was initially founded as International Data Corporation (IDC) in 1964 by Patrick Joseph McGovern, shortly after he had graduated from the Massachusetts Institute of Technology (MIT). Based in Massachusetts, the company produced a computer installation database, and published a newsletter, "EDP Industry and Market Report" (modeled on "ADP Newsletter", which was published by the Diebold Group). Companies such as RCA, Univac, Xerox, and Burroughs paid IDC for use of the data base. During this time, McGovern continued to work as a writer for "Computers and Automation" magazine, the first computer magazine, published by Edmund Berkeley.

Publisher History 
By IDG's third year, McGovern was considering liquidating the company when he hit on the idea of launching Computerworld in 1967, which was a continuation of the monthly newsletter, published weekly instead of monthly, in a different format, with advertising, and which would become a cornerstone of IDG's subsequent publishing arm. McGovern subsequently founded PC World.

In 1969, IDG made its first overseas expansion when it opened IDC UK and launched its first European publication. In 1974, the company launched its first international publication, Computerwoche, in Germany, its first fully translated publication. International publications in Japan, China, the then Soviet Union, Vietnam, and other countries would follow throughout the 1990s. 

In 1984, the company launched MacWorld in the same week that the Macintosh computer was debuted, and featured Steve Jobs on its cover. In the 1991, IDG Books launched its For Dummies series with DOS for Dummies, and published many instructional/reference books under the series until Hungry Minds (the new name for IDG books) was acquired by John Wiley & Sons, Inc. in 2001. 

In 2007, IDG ceased print publication of InfoWorld U.S. and made the content available online only, signaling the company's transition to a web-centric model for publication.

Events, Research & Technology Marketing 
Throughout the 1970s and 1980s, IDG would break into the events and research spaces. In the early 1970s, it launched its Computer Caravan trade show in the US, reaching nine US cities in 11 weeks. By 1972, the Computer Caravan had a European presence as well. 

In the 1980s, IDG launched IDC Predictions via its subsidiary IDC, which would come to represent the company's technology research and analyst arm. The company still maintains an IDC Predictions team of analysts today that publish regular findings on the state of the worldwide technology industry. 

In 1991, the first IDG DEMO Conference was held in La Quinta, CA as a live forum where companies could debut their latest technology live on stage in front of crowds of technology consumers, business decision makers, and investors. The event, which would go on to be held as conferences across the US, Asia, South America, and other countries through 2015, served as the site of notable product and software launches such as Adobe Acrobat, PalmPilot, VMware Virtual Hardware, Netscape, and Salesforce. 

By the mid-2000s the company had established a rich online and print publication business, a trusted market research and analyst division, and a large global trade show presence - all which contributed to the growth of a database of over six million technology buyers and professionals. In 2006, IDG made this database of readers, website visitors, and event attendees available to technology marketers via its demand generation division IDG Connect. In 2010, IDG introduced the "Nanosite", an advertising tool designed as an alternative to a microsite.

Changing Ownership 
Following McGovern's death in 2014, ownership of the corporate passed to the Patrick J. McGovern Foundation, until 2017 when it was purchased by China Oceanwide Holdings Group. IDG, Inc. changed ownership again in May 2021 when Blackstone Inc. acquired the corporation from China Oceanwide Holdings Group for $1.3 billion.

Divisions & Brands 
IDG, Inc. serves as the parent company of two major company divisions, IDC and Foundry.

International Data Corporation (IDC) 
IDC is a wholly-owned subsidiary of IDG, Inc. and is a global provider of market intelligence, advisory services, and events for the information technology, telecommunications, and consumer technology markets. IDC employs over 2,500 people globally including more than 1,300 analysts worldwide to offer expertise and insights on technology and industry trends.

In 2019, Crawford Del Prete was named president of IDC after serving as its Chief Operating Officer (COO).

In May 2021, IDC acquired Dutch IT intelligence consultancy Metri, bolstering its presence in the Benelux region and strengthening IDC’s reach and insight into Europe’s IT industry.

Foundry 
Foundry is a wholly-owned subsidiary of IDG, Inc. and is a global provider of media & event services, marketing technology, and intent data for B2B technology marketers. Formerly known as IDG Communications, the IDG Inc. subsidiary company rebranded from IDG Communications to Foundry in February 2022 as part of its strategic transformation from publisher to data and martech company. Foundry employs over 1,400 people globally and operates in over 140 countries around the world.

Between 2020 and 2022, Foundry acquired leading data and marketing technology (MarTech) companies Triblio, Kickfire, Leadsift, and Selling Simplified as part of its strategy to transform from legacy media network to integrated marketing technology and data provider. Through both homegrown and acquired data and technologies, Foundry continues to leverage their established media brands to gather and provide insights about global technology buyers to marketers in the same space.

Editorial Brands (Foundry) 
Foundry owns and operates various editorial brands that publish relevant content for technology buyers in both the B2B and consumer spaces across over 90 countries. With some like Computerworld and MacWorld dating back to McGovern’s early ownership, the editorial brands remain central to Foundry’s operations in media and technology marketing, though many of the editorial brands have transitioned from print to digital.

Editorial Brands:

 CIO publishes content relevant to its network of over 4 million chief information officers and IT thought leaders in 72 countries.  Its award-winning website, CIO.com, is a popular resource for IT decision makers.
 ChannelWorld covers the sales channel and publishes content relevant to IT distributors and resellers globally.
 Computerworld reaches over 12 million enterprise-level IT managers globally and offers practical advice, best practices, and trends related to web applications and tools that technology professionals use and implement to support their business.
 CSO is a security-focused publication that offers content to chief security officers and IT security professionals surrounding risk management, network defense, fraud, and data protection. 
 InfoWorld caters to developers, architects, and business leaders launching next-generation initiatives on scalable cloud platforms, and publishes content around evolving, future-forward technology such as artificial intelligence, machine learning, big data analytics, and NoSQL databases. 
 MacWorld publishes content related to Apple hardware and software releases, reviews, tutorials, and tips for Apple product users at both the business and private consumer level. 
 Network World is dedicated to supporting the modern data center with content aimed at data center managers around cloud computing, storage, server and virtualization technologies. Network World reaches a network of over 2 million IT professionals across 14 countries. 
 PCWorld serves consumer and business audiences with content around evolving software technology and hardware for PCs with a focus on educating PC owner and advocates in their personal and professional purchases. 
 TechHive is a consumer-facing editorial brand that publishes content related to the connected home, home entertainment, and the Internet of Things. TechHive publishes reviews for connected products, featured deals, and tips for the connected homeowner.

Awards, Recognitions & Notable Events 
In 2000, Salesforce was launched at IDG's DEMO Event the premier launch venue for new technologies from 1991-2015. 

In 2001, Fortune Magazine named IDG, Inc. to its list of "The 100 Best Companies to Work For," ranking the company at number 58.  

IDG Books launched the popular reference book series For Dummies in 1991, which it owned for 10 years until selling to John Wiley & Sons, Inc. in 2001. 

The first ever iPhone was revealed by Steve Jobs at a MacWorld conference in 2007.

References

 
1964 establishments in Massachusetts
2017 mergers and acquisitions
2021 mergers and acquisitions
China Oceanwide Holdings Group
Companies based in Norfolk County, Massachusetts
Magazine publishing companies of the United States
Needham, Massachusetts
Privately held companies based in Massachusetts
Publishing companies established in 1964
Research and analysis firms of the United States
The Blackstone Group companies